The Daily Signal is a conservative American political media news website founded in June 2014. The publication focuses on politics, policy, and culture and offers political commentary from a conservative perspective. It is published by conservative think tank The Heritage Foundation.

Overview

The Daily Signal is a digital-only news publication created by American conservative think tank The Heritage Foundation based in Washington D.C. The publication reports on American politics and public policy issues, both foreign and domestic, with a focus on stories it believes to be unreported or under-reported. The site relies on original investigative reporting and initially aimed to be an unbiased news source, but it is currently pro-conservative in its content. It was created as an attempt to remedy what the organization saw as a lack of original reporting on public policy issues  from understaffed publications.

The Daily Signal also includes an opinion section geared toward Millennial readers that features conservative commentary, but that is kept separate from the news section. Entertainment and sports stories that relate to politics are also published by the site.

As of 2014, the publication had a staff of 12 and used freelance investigative reporters. The editor-in-chief is Robert Bluey, former editor at Human Events and reporter for Cybercast News Service.

Other key staff include Katrina Trinko, former National Review political reporter, who is the managing editor.

The Daily Signal is funded entirely by The Heritage Foundation. The publication's initial annual budget was US$1 million.

History
Before starting The Daily Signal, The Heritage Foundation ran two other digital publications: The Foundry, a blog, and Townhall.com, a news and opinion site. Townhall.com was acquired by Salem Communications in 2005, while The Foundry was phased out following the advent of The Daily Signal.

The Daily Signal was announced by The Heritage Foundation in May 2014. Atlantic Media Strategies was hired to design the site specifically for mobile phones and tablets. Kelly McBride, Poynter's media ethicist, commented that The Daily Signal could never be credible for liberal readers, but could reach an undecided audience, so long as the publication removed political agenda and published quality work from trained journalists.

The site was officially launched in June 2014. Debut stories included an interview with Kansas Governor Sam Brownback about federal health care law's effects on his state, and an account of a recent trip to the DMZ from Jim DeMint, the president of The Heritage Foundation. In September 2014, Sharyl Attkisson's interview with former Deputy Assistant Secretary of State Raymond Maxwell was picked up by multiple outlets, including Fox News, CBS News, Slate, and the New York Daily News.

References

External links

American conservative websites
Internet properties established in 2014
American news websites
The Heritage Foundation
2014 establishments in Washington, D.C.
Podcasting companies